Cripavirus is a genus of viruses in the order Picornavirales, in the family Dicistroviridae. Invertebrates serve as natural hosts. There are four species in this genus. Diseases associated with this genus include: DCV: increased reproductive potential; extremely pathogenic when injected with high associated mortality; CrPV: paralysis and death. These viruses can produce proteins directly from their RNA genome upon entering a cell; and therefore, does not require an RNA polymerase packaged in with it, as this may be produced from the genome after entering the cell.
The name of the cripavirus family originates from its most famous member the Cricket Paralysis Virus. Which was made famous by its rather unusual IRES (Internal Ribosome Entry Site): the Cripavirus IRES.  The Cripavirus IRES is an RNA element that allows the virus to bind the ribosome and translate without a need for any initiation factors – as initiation is the most regulated step of translation this allows the virus to avoid many mechanisms to inhibit viral activity.

Taxonomy
The genus contains the following species:
Aphid lethal paralysis virus
Cricket paralysis virus
Drosophila C virus
Rhopalosiphum padi virus

Structure

Viruses in Cripavirus are non-enveloped, have capsids of 12 capsomers, and have icosahedral geometries with T=pseudo3 symmetry. The diameter is around 30 nm. Genomes are linear and non-segmented, around 8.5–10.2kb in length, and has a VPg (genome linked viral protein) on the 5' end. The 5' end also has a series of C's near it, while the 3' end has a series of A's near it. The genome has 2 open reading frames.

Life cycle
Entry into the host cell is achieved by penetration into the host cell. Replication follows the positive stranded RNA virus replication model. Positive stranded rna virus transcription is the method of transcription. Translation takes place by viral initiation, and ribosomal skipping. Invertebrates serve as the natural host. Transmission routes are contamination.

References

External links
 Viralzone: Cripavirus
 ICTV

Dicistroviridae
Virus genera